The Yolo Bypass Wildlife Area is located within the Yolo Bypass in Yolo County, California. The wildlife area is managed by the California Department of Fish and Wildlife with the intent of restoring and managing a variety of wildlife habitats in the Yolo Basin, a natural basin in the north part of the Sacramento-San Joaquin River Delta. The creation of the wildlife area was spearheaded by the Yolo Basin Foundation. The California Department of Fish and Wildlife and Yolo Basin Foundation are the core partners in the operation of this unique community resource. Located at

History
The wildlife area was open to the public in 1997 after extensive restoration efforts completed by Ducks Unlimited with federal funds appropriated through the United States Army Corps of Engineers. In 1999, this  restoration project was named the Vic Fazio Yolo Wildlife Area in honor of congressman Vic Fazio who lobbied hard for the funds needed to build the project. These acquisitions included the  Tule Ranch, a working cattle ranch with extensive vernal pool areas.

Habitats, Flora, & Fauna
Most wetland on the wildlife area are managed as seasonal wetlands. They go through an extensive dry period during the spring and summer months. Typically these ponds are drained April 1 to stimulate the germination of Swamp Timothy. They may receive a brief summer irrigation and then are flooded in September to provide wetland habitat for migratory waterfowl and shorebirds.

Permanent wetlands are flooded year round and tend to be deeper and have more emergent vegetation. These ponds provide important brood water for resident aquatic birds such as mallards, common moorhens and pied-billed grebes. They also provide drinking water for wildlife as well as relief from intense summer heat. This habitat is used extensively for roosting by black-crowned night herons, egrets, and white-faced ibis. The giant garter snake also occurs in this habitat.

Upland habitats are used extensively by ground nesting birds such northern harriers, western meadowlarks, mallards and ring-necked pheasant. Vegetation is typically dominated by annual rye grass, curly dock and wild sunflower. Rodent populations in these areas provide prey for large numbers of wintering birds of prey.

Approximately  of natural uplands occur in the southwest portion of the wildlife area. There are several vernal pools in this area that are home to such invertebrate species as tadpole shrimp, clam shrimp and the endangered conservancy fairy shrimp. Rare and endangered plants include Heckert's pepperweed and Ferris' alkali milk vetch. Grassland bird species in this area include grasshopper sparrow, Savannah sparrow and burrowing owl. 

Riparian vegetation consists of willows, cottonwoods, black walnut and other tree species. Nesting species here include Swainson's hawks, great-horned owls, wood ducks, tree swallows, and black phoebe. This habitat is very important for neo-tropical migrants such as blue grosbeak, ash-throated flycatchers, and a variety of warbler species. Most riparian vegetation is located along Putah Creek in the central part of the wildlife area.

Other uses

Flood control
The Yolo Bypass is a  flood control channel that protects Sacramento and other cities from flooding. The wildlife area was created with the understanding that it would remain completely compatible with this primary flood control function. For this reason, there are restrictions on the density of emergent vegetation and riparian trees within the wildlife area. These standards are determined through the use of hydrological models. 

Located at the north end of the Yolo Basin where Putah Creek enters the Yolo Bypass, this part of the Delta is known as the Putah Sinks and hosts a diverse assemblage of wildlife species inhabiting seasonal wetlands, permanent wetlands, riparian forest, uplands, vernal pools and agricultural habitats.

Agriculture

An interesting feature of the wildlife area is the extensive use of agriculture to achieve its wildlife habitat goals, while providing important operating income.  In the northern portions of the wildlife area, rice is grown, which is then flooded after harvest, attracting thousands of waterfowl and shorebirds in full view of the thousands of automobiles on Interstate 80. Wildlife managers have instituted a rotation within the rice fields that allows for a fallow stage every three years. During this fallow stage, the field is managed for migratory shorebirds by flooding during the mid-summer months.

Public use

The wildlife area is open every day (except Christmas) for wildlife viewing and fishing. There are monthly tours on the second Saturday of each month conducted by volunteers from the Yolo Basin Foundation. Other public use opportunities are provided by the Yolo Basin Foundation and Fish and Wildlife including bat tours, open houses and a fall/winter speaker series.   

Hunting for waterfowl, pheasant and mourning dove is conducted in specific area by the California Department of Fish and Wildlife during the fall and winter months.

The "Discover the Flyway" environmental education program annually brings approximately 4,000 students per year to learn about wetlands and visit the wildlife area. California Duck Days is an annual wildlife festival held each February, which includes educational exhibits and field trips to observe wildlife. Other activities include trout fishing for children, a mobile aquarium and displays of live captive raptors.

Tule Ranch

This  ranch was purchased in 2001 as part of a large expansion of the wildlife area. It had been owned by the Glide family for over 130 years. The western portion of the Tule Ranch contains vernal pools within a mostly natural grassland. Spectacular wildflower displays occur in the spring. Some notable breeding grassland species include grasshopper sparrow, Savannah sparrow and western meadowlark. A prominent landmark in the area is the Umbrella Barn, a large wooden barn that is over 100 years old. 

The Tule Ranch is host to a large grazing program. Some fields are managed for maximum nutritional value in the form of legumes such as burr clover. These fields also provide important forage for migratory snow geese and white-fronted geese. Cattle are the primary management tool in the vernal pool habitat area. Their removal of thatch from the thick stands of annual rye grass help facilitate the germination of native forbs in this area, resulting in spectacular blooms of wildflowers each spring. At the very bottom of the Tule Ranch is the Fireman's Club, a square mile of property that contains a historic slough that once drained into the Yolo Basin. This section of land was hunted by the Dixon Fire District employees for many years in exchange for their emergency services to the ranch.

References

External links
Yolo Basin Foundation
California Dept. of Fish and Wildlife: Yolo Bypass Wildlife Area webpage
Picasa: Yolo Bypass Wildlife Area images

Nature reserves in California
California Department of Fish and Wildlife areas
Protected areas of Yolo County, California
Sacramento River